An unusually prolific summer tornado outbreak affected parts of the Northern United States from the late evening and overnight hours of July 28 into the early morning hours of July 29. It started with a powerful line of severe thunderstorms that produced widespread damaging straight-line winds and multiple embedded weak tornadoes across the state of Wisconsin. During the afternoon and evening of July 29, numerous tornadic supercells developed across portions of the Ohio Valley and Mid-Atlantic regions, producing many tornadoes. A few of the tornadoes were strong and damaging, including an EF3 tornado that caused severe damage in the Philadelphia suburbs of Trevose and Bensalem. A motorist was killed after driving into a tree felled by straight line-winds near Ripon, Wisconsin, though no tornado-related fatalities occurred. This is the largest tornado outbreak for the combined region of southeast Pennsylvania and New Jersey on record.

Meteorological synopsis
On the morning of July 28, the SPC issued a moderate risk for much of Wisconsin, with an enhanced risk area extending from eastern Minnesota to southern Michigan, and southward into the extreme northern portions of Illinois and Indiana. As a frontal-wave low and associated warm front moved across the Great Lakes region, an extremely unstable and increasingly moist environment was in place across part of Minnesota and most of Wisconsin. By the late afternoon and early evening hours, significant moisture advection and daytime heating had occurred, with steep lapse rates present and CAPE values reaching up to 4500 J/kg across the threat area. With the aforementioned parameters in place, the potential existed for a significant, widespread damaging straight-line wind event to occur, potentially reaching derecho criteria. However, with helicity values at up to 600 J/kg, and effective shear reaching 70 kts, a secondary threat for tornadic supercells and embedded circulations within the line was also present, and a 10% risk area for tornadoes was outlined. Late that evening, several supercell thunderstorms initiated and intensified rapidly in the threat area. The supercells quickly merged into a linear MCS, which pushed southward across Wisconsin overnight and into the early morning hours of July 29. While the line of storms did not reach derecho criteria, extensive damage from straight-line winds and weak tornados embedded within the squall line occurred across a large portion of Wisconsin. Two EF1 tornadoes caused damage to many trees and the roofs of homes in the Madison, Wisconsin suburbs of West Middleton and Verona. The storms produced additional wind damage in the extreme northern portions of Illinois and Indiana, before weakening to sub-severe levels and pushing though the Ohio Valley region by sunrise.

As remnants of the initial MCS complex decayed over Ohio, decreasing clouds, along with increasing temperatures and moisture began to overspread the Ohio Valley and farther east into the Mid-Atlantic region. The SPC issued slight risk with a 2% tornado risk area for the Ohio Valley, and an enhanced risk with a 5% tornado risk in the Mid-Atlantic states. Moderate shear and instability were in place across both regions, with 1000-2000 J/kg of CAPE and 40-45 kts of shear. A few tornadoes were expected to occur, though the main threat was thought to be hail and damaging winds. However, areas of enhanced helicity from remnant outflow boundaries were present as well, and the low-level wind profile became favorable for rotating supercells and tornadoes as the day progressed. By the afternoon, numerous tornadic supercells had developed, and many tornadoes touched down, a few of which were significant. This included an EF2 tornado that caused substantial damage in New Athens, Ohio. An EF3 tornado, the strongest of the outbreak, severely impacted suburban areas of the Philadelphia metro area, injuring 5 people and destroying structures. This tornado promoted the NWS office in Mount Holly, New Jersey to issue their first ever PDS tornado warning. Farther west, storm intensity and coverage was less intense, though a few weak tornadoes also touched down in Indiana and Illinois. By the evening, the storms moved towards the coast and out into the Atlantic Ocean, including a supercell that spawned an EF2 tornado which struck High Bar Harbor, New Jersey, resulting in structural damage and minor injuries. Severe storms and tornado activity had ceased and moved out of the area after sunset. Damage totaled US$315 million.

Confirmed tornadoes

July 28 event

July 29 event

Non-tornadic impacts 
One person was killed after his car crashed into a fallen tree in Ripon, Wisconsin. Flat Rock, Indiana saw  of rain from the storm. Rainfall in New Jersey varied heavily, with up to  recorded. Further north, parts of Interstate 91 in southern Vermont closed due to flooding on the night of July 29.

See also

 List of North American tornadoes and tornado outbreaks
 List of United States tornadoes in July 2021
 Hurricane Ida tornado outbreak – Another tornado outbreak that produced major damage in the region just over a month later

Notes

References

Tornado outbreaks
F3 tornadoes
Tornadoes in Pennsylvania
Tornadoes in New Jersey
Tornadoes of 2021